In the Shadow of Kilimanjaro is a 1986 British-Kenyan natural horror film set in Kenya. The film was directed by Raju Patel.

Plot
In 1984, in the small town of Namanga, Kenya, a young girl is found alone in the wilderness. Jack Ringtree, who found the girl, brings her to the local school to find out more about her. Namanga is going through a severe drought, which causes water to become scarce. Jack visits a nearby mining outpost to ask if they have water. the owner, Chris Tucker, tells him off. Jack's wife, Lee, arrives in Namanga that night, and has sex with Jack. Meanwhile, a local boy is kidnapped by a troop of chacma baboons.

The next morning, one of the miners, Claud Gagnon, is mauled by a troop of baboons. The grandfather of the missing child calls up Jack and Chris, asking if they can help him find his grandson. Chris leads the miners and a group of Maasai women to looks for the missing child. They find both the bodies of the child and Claud. The group massacres a troop of baboons while Jack takes images as proof.

Jack and Chris pled to the local district officer, Tshombe, to evacuate everyone in Namanga to Nairobi, but Tshombe dismisses them. Jack then travels to Nairobi to find someone who can eradicate the baboons, but is also dismissed. Lucille, Claud's wife, griefs over his death and plans to leave Kenya. Meanwhile, two electricians tries to fix a broken telephone line. A troop of baboons attacks them and kills one of the man, while the other escapes.

The next day, Lee is attacked and almost killed by a troop of baboons, but is saved by Jack. The mining outpost is also attacked by a large troop of baboons, but everyone escaped. Chris gets a report of a supply truck that crashed 10 miles away from Namanga. Chris, Jack, and two miners, Odom and Uto, travels to the site. Uto explores the area and finds that almost everything has been stolen. The others find a troop of baboons with the supply. Chris scares them off and Jack explores the flipped supply truck. The troop of baboons returns, now more fierce, Chris, Odom, and Uto takes of on the jeep, leaving Jack behind. Meanwhile, Tshombe flies Lucille flies out of town, but are attacked and killed by a stowaway baboon.

When Chris returns, he gets a report about a local school getting attacked. He sends Odom and Uto to take care of the situation. Jack bribes the troop of baboons and successfully escapes. He hot wires an abandoned bus and meets up with Chris. They all head to the school and successfully saves everyone.

The entire town is barricaded inside a local hotel, with the miners guarding the area. The teacher, Linda, is suddenly killed by a baboon that broke into the hotel. The miners protect the locals, while Chris and Jack fights off the horde of monkeys. Chris is knocked out when it suddenly rains. The rain scares away the baboons and causes the town's drought to finally be over.

Cast
John Rhys-Davies ... Chris Tucker
Timothy Bottoms ... Jack Ringtree
Irene Miracle ... Lee Ringtree
Michele Carey ... Ginny Hansen
Don Blakely ... Julius X. Odom
Calvin Jung ... Mitushi Uto
Patrick Gorman ... Eugene Kurtz
Mark Watters ... Carlyle Bandy
Jim Boeke ... Claud Gagnon
Patty Foley ... Lucille Gagnon
Carl Vundla ... District Officer Tshombe

External links

1986 films
1986 horror films
British natural horror films
Films set in 1984
Films set in Kenya
Films about monkeys
1980s English-language films
1980s British films